Raxaul is a sub-divisional town in the East Champaran district of the Indian state of Bihar. It is situated at the India-Nepal border with Birgunj city (Nepal). Raxaul is a major railway junction.

The Indian border town of Raxaul has become one of the busiest towns for heavy transportation due to high trade volume. Almost 56% of the total products of Birgunj are exported to the Indian state of Bihar through this route.

Demographics
 India census, Raxaul Bazar had a population of 55,532. Males constitute 54% of the population and females 46%. Raxaul Bazar has an average literacy rate of 75.62%, higher than the state average of 61.80%: male literacy is 82.14%, and female literacy is 68.25%. In Raxaul Bazar, 16.21% of the population is under 6 years of age. People communicate with each other in the Bhojpuri and Hindi languages.

History 
Earlier the name of the town is used to be Falejarganj.

Transport 
Raxaul is the only city that is connected with Nepal. Birgunj railway station is connected by the Nepal Government Railway (NGR) to Raxaul Junction railway station in Bihar across the border with India. The  railway extends north to Amlekhganj in Nepal. It was built in 1927 by the British but discontinued beyond Birgunj in December 1965.[3] The 6 km (3.7 mi) railway track from Raxaul to Birgunj was converted to broad gauge two years after the Indian railways converted the track to Raxaul inside India to broad gauge. Now, broad gauge railway line connects Raxaul to the Sirsiya (Birgunj) Inland Container Depot (ICD) which became fully operational in 2005. Talks have been held to reopen the railway route from Birgunj to Amlekhganj in Nepal by converting it to broad gauge because of its socio-economic importance.

Rail 
Raxaul Junction railway station is situated on the Delhi – Gorakhpur - Raxaul - Chakia - Muzaffarpur - Kolkata lines.

Raxaul is connected to several cities in Bihar with daily passenger trains. There are multiple daily connections to Muzaffarpur, Sugauli, Chakia, Bairgania and Sitamarhi and daily connections to Bagaha, Hajipur, Samastipur, Motihari and Narkatiaganj.

Daily express trains connect to Delhi with stops in major cities in Uttar Pradesh including Gorakhpur and Bareilly. Kolkata is also connected by a daily express train ; the train being 13021 Howrah Raxaul Mithila Express.

There are also direct trains to Lucknow and Varanasi with stops in several towns in Uttar Pradesh. Chhapra, Patna, chakia, Jabalpur, Mumbai, Darbhanga, Barauni, Dhanbad, Bokaro, Ranchi, Rourkela, Bilaspur, Raipur, Nagpur and Hyderabad are also connected by weekly or multiple weekly trains.

Delhi is connected via Satyagraha Express and Sadbhawna Express. Earlier, all tracks were metre gauge but most have been converted to  broad gauge. After the completion of the gauge conversion from Darbhanga to Raxaul via Sitamarhi, another broad gauge route to Raxaul became available from March 2014. The metre gauge track from Raxaul to Narkatiaganj converted in 2018/august.03 pair passenger trains operated in this route.

Road 
Raxaul is connected to major cities of India by National Highway 28A. However, the condition of NH 28A is terrible causing regular traffic jams. It is the main route to Nepal. The capital of Nepal, Kathmandu is connected with India through this highway. There is a bus terminal from where buses are available for most of the cities in Bihar and Jharkhand.

Airlines and destinations
Raxaul Airport (ICAO: VERL) is located at Ekderwa Raxaul in the state of Bihar, India. It was established after the Sino-Indian War of 1962, when it served as an emergency landing ground for the Indian Army. The Airports Authority of India (AAI) that owns the airport has undertaken a pre-feasibility study at the airport to upgrade the airport to handle ATR-72 aircraft. A draft Master Plan highlighting a requirement of an additional 121 acres of land has been submitted to the State Government.

Now, there is currently no scheduled commercial air service. Raxaul can be reached by flying to Simara in Nepal. That airport is 27 km from Raxaul and has direct flights to Kathmandu. A proposal to operationalize the airport for civilian use has been drafted.

Border crossing
India and Nepal have an open border with no restrictions on movement of their nationals and no need of visa or passport documents for local people.  There is a customs checkpoint for goods and third country nationals. There are Jeeps, Cars, Tempos (Three wheels vehicles), and the Tangas (Horse Driven 6 seater Rickshaws) from Raxaul station for Birganj bus park.

River

Sariswa River 

The river, Sariswa (Sirsiya), a tributary of the Burhi Gandak, originates from Pathlahia hill of the dense Ramban forests in Nepal, its course roaming through the subdivision cutting through Bara and Parsa districts in Nepal and Raxaul in Bihar, India. It flows southwards from the place of its origin for about 15 km in Nepal and then enters India at Raxaul. From here, the river flows about 20 km in India and joins Burhi Gandak near Sugauli in East Champaran district. The water is pure in its contents and have full of medicinal values like other Himalayan rivers. It maintains its valuable contents till Parwanipur. But after it, unrestrained untreated wastes are being dumped by the 46 factories situated at Birgunj (Nepal) which make this river contaminated. The colour of the river turned into black besides, emanating foul smell has made the life of the people, who dwell near the river, a nightmare.

Bangari River 
It is the neighbor river of Sariswa (Sirsiya) river.

 Adapur, Bihar
 Birganj, Nepal
 East Champaran district

References

Cities and towns in East Champaran district
Transit and customs posts along the India–Nepal border
Points for exit and entry of nationals from third countries along the India–Nepal border